The American School of Doha  (ASD) is located in Doha, Qatar. The school was founded in 1988 by United States Ambassador Joseph Ghougassian to serve the needs of the American community in Qatar.  Sponsored by the US Embassy, it operated until 1997 as the American International School (AIS).

There are about 2250 students, with approximately 650 in the high school and 1500 in upper elementary. More than 80 countries are represented by the students of ASD. Approximately 38% of the students are U.S. nationals, 10% are Qatari nationals, and approximately 52% are nationals of other countries.

Campus

In 2007, the school opened a new building adjacent to the old American School. It was designed to be “one of the top five international school facilities in the world, as far as design for learning is concerned." 
The former building was renovated, to include an expanded library, a new and larger multi-purpose room, an expanded cafeteria, two elementary science labs and a new central office complex.

Athletics

The school was formerly a member of the Eastern Mediterranean Activities Conference (EMAC). In 2010, ASD collaborated with five other schools from the conference to create a new, smaller conference called the Middle East South Asia Conference (MESAC). ASD offers a plethora of competition at the JV and Varsity levels. All sports offered are as such: swimming, volleyball, academic games, golf, basketball, football (soccer), senior fine arts, tennis, cross country, track & field, baseball/softball, badminton, and forensics. Thanks to the encouragement and support given towards athletics at the school, there is a high prevalence of student-athletes.

See also

 Americans in Qatar

References

Educational institutions established in 1988
1988 establishments in Qatar
Schools in Qatar
American international schools in Qatar